The northern red-legged frog (Rana aurora) is a species of amphibian, whose range is the coastal region stretching from southwest British Columbia to southern Mendocino County in Northern California, and is protected in Oregon and California. As a member of the genus Rana, this species is considered a true frog, with characteristic smooth skin and a narrow waist.  This frog requires still waters for breeding, and is rarely found at any great distance from its breeding ponds or marshes.

The northern red-legged frog has long, powerful legs well adapted to jumping. It is one of two amphibian species classified as red-legged frog, the other species being the California red-legged frog (Rana draytonii); however, the latter species is found from southern Mendocino County southerly to Baja California.

Range
The northern red-legged frog is found in the Pacific Northwest, in western Oregon, western Washington and southwestern British Columbia, including Vancouver Island. In California, its range includes every coastal county from southern Mendocino County northward. While it occurs primarily in the Northern California coastal mountain ranges, it is not found above an elevation of 1200 m.  It also occurs somewhat less commonly in the southern Cascade Range.

Habitat

The still waters of ponds, marshes or stream pools are essential for northern red-legged frog breeding habitat; moreover, this species of frog is considered unusually highly oriented to its aquatic habitat, with a clear preference for thickly vegetated shoreline.  R. aurora requires cover, since it is subject to predation by various fishes, snakes, birds, mammals, and even certain other amphibians.  When this frog senses danger, it will quickly plunge to depths of one meter or more to seek safety in the benthic zone of a pond.

Adults leave the breeding pond soon after the breeding activity is concluded, and may migrate about one half kilometer to their summer locations, which are likely to be riparian zones.  In the northern part of their range, adults may hibernate.  Juveniles are slower to leave the breeding ponds, but also tend to find cover in riparian areas, and may readily migrate about one half kilometer by summertime.  Mature R. aurora specimens prey upon terrestrial insects, but will also take small snails and crustaceans; also, they will consume worms, tadpoles, small fish. and even small frogs of other species.  The tadpoles are herbivorous.

Breeding
Males and females begin to move to the breeding sites as early as October, and sometimes as late as January, depending on latitude, cumulative rainfall for the season, and average temperature. Typically, stable minimum temperatures of 42 to 44 °F (5.5 to 6.5 °C) are required to induce breeding. Observations of adult migration are best made on moonlit nights with light rains.  The male is thought to defend his territory, once he is in the breeding pond area, using nocturnal displays.  In fact, most activity is at night, especially enhanced by periods of light rain.  The actual courtship behaviors commence in January in the California part of the range, and as late as March in northerly regions.  In any case, the breeding season terminates in July at the latest, and earlier in the drier locales.

Each female produces 200 to 1100 eggs per season, and attaches the egg cluster to submerged vegetation or rotting logs, characteristically seven to 15 cm below the pond surface. Egg clusters are typically about 10 cm in diameter, and may disperse into an irregular form underwater.  Eggs hatch in 39 to 45 days, and tadpoles require about 80 days to attain metamorphosis.

Oviposition generally takes place in densely vegetated, shallow portions of wetlands with little current, and in unusual cases, egg masses have been observed in water up to 500 cm in depth. Breeding sites can be either permanent or temporary, with inundation usually necessary into June for successful metamorphosis. The June date is based on Oregon conditions; in Northern California, metamorphosis occurs in late May or early June.  Breeding is initiated when water temperatures exceed about 6°C (usually in January), but can be as late as March in the extreme northern part of the range.

References

Further reading
 Hillis, D. M. & Wilcox, T. P. (2005): Phylogeny of the New World true frogs (Rana). Mol. Phylogenet. Evol. 34(2): 299–314.  PDF fulltext. 
 Hillis, D. M. (2007) Constraints in naming parts of the Tree of Life. Mol. Phylogenet. Evol. 42: 331–338.
 Shaffer, H. Bradley, Gary M. Fellers, S. Randal Voss, Jeff Oliver, Greg Pauly. (2004): Species boundaries, phylogeography, and conservation genetics of the red-legged frog (Rana aurora/draytonii) complex. Molecular Ecology. 13(9): 2667–2677.

External links
 

 Identification and habitat of the northern red-legged frog
 Rana aurora 

Rana (genus)
Amphibians of the United States
Amphibians of Canada
Fauna of California
Amphibians described in 1852